Janie Lopez is an American politician who is a member of the Texas House of Representatives, representing the 37th district. Her district comprises Willacy County and parts of Cameron County. Prior to her election to the house in 2022, Lopez served as a trustee of the San Benito school board. Lopez is the first Latina Republican to represent the Rio Grande Valley in the House.

Tenure  
Lopez serves on the Environmental Regulation Committee and the Juvenile Justice & Family Issue Committee.

Elections 
In 2022, Lopez defeated Democrat Luis Villareal Jr. in a competitive race flipping the seat.

Political positions

Term limits
Lopez supports term limits for members of congress signing the Term Limits Convention pledge.

Personal life 
Lopez's parents legally immigrated to the United States from Mexico. Lopez is the middle child of seven and is the first in her family to attend and graduate from college with honorary awards. She has stated she is guided by her Christian values.

References 

Living people
Republican Party members of the Texas House of Representatives
21st-century American politicians
Year of birth missing (living people)
American politicians of Mexican descent
Christians from Texas
Hispanic and Latino American women in politics
Women in Texas politics
Latino conservatism in the United States